This article is a catalog of actresses and models who have appeared on the cover of Harper's Bazaar Brazil, the Brazilian edition of Harper's Bazaar magazine, starting with the magazine's first issue in November 2011.

2011

2012

2013

2014

2015

2016

2017

2018

2019

External links
 Harper's Bazaar Brazil
 Harper's Bazaar Brazil on Models.com

Brazil
Brazilian entertainment-related lists